Aetna, Arkansas, may refer to:
Aetna, Craighead County, Arkansas
Aetna, Sharp County, Arkansas